Thuravoor railway station (Code: TUVR) is a railway station in Alappuzha District, Kerala and falls under the Thiruvananthapuram railway division of the Southern Railway zone, Indian Railways.

References

External links

Railway stations in Alappuzha district
Railway stations opened in 1989